Paul Hague (born 16 September 1972) is an English former professional footballer who played in the Football League as a central defender.

References

1972 births
Living people
English footballers
Association football defenders
Gillingham F.C. players
Leyton Orient F.C. players
Cork City F.C. players
Dagenham & Redbridge F.C. players
Gateshead F.C. players
English Football League players
National League (English football) players
People from Shotley Bridge
Footballers from County Durham